Andorra sent competitors to the 2018 Winter Paralympics in Pyeongchang, South Korea. They will compete in para-alpine skiing. The country first went to the Winter Paralympics in 2002.  When they arrive in Pyeongchang, they will be competing in their fifth Winter Paralympics.

Team 
The International Paralympic Committee confirmed that Andorra will compete at the 2018 Winter Paralympics.

The table below contains the list of members of people (called "Team Andorra") that will be participating in the 2018 Games.

History 
The country first went to the Winter Paralympics in 2002.  When they arrive in Pyeongchang, they will be competing in their fifth Winter Paralympics.  Their best finish at the Winter Games was in 2010, when Paquita Ramirez Capitan was ninth in the women's Giant Slalom.

References 

2018
Nations at the 2018 Winter Paralympics
2018 in Andorran sport